The Fall of Rome  is a 1963 Italian peplum film written and directed by Anthony Dawson.

Plot  
Immediately following the death of Constantine the proconsul Junio resumed the persecutions against Christians. Among them is the centurion Mark, who manages to escape arrest and, together with her sister Licia, sets out on a journey to the consul Gaius. Attacked by soldiers of Valerio, Marco is saved with the help of a barbarian tribe, but loses Licia. Junio promises to Marco that all Christians will be freed if he agrees to fight in the arena and manages to defeat all his opponents. Accompanied by Svetla, a girl barbarian, Marco fights and returns freedom to Christians, but suddenly an earthquake strikes.

Cast 

 Carl Möhner as Marco 
 Loredana Nusciak as  Svetla 
 Andrea Aureli as Rako
 Ida Galli as  Licia
  Piero Palermini  as Valerio 
 Giancarlo Sbragia as Giunio
 Nando Tamberlani as Matteo 
 Maria Grazia Buccella as  Xenia
  Jim Dolen  as  Caio
  Richard Ricci  as Tullio
 Maria Laura Rocca as Tullio's mother
 Renato Terra

Release
Fall of Rome was released in Italy on February 28, 1963.

Reception
The Monthly Film Bulletin stated that outside "picturesque outdoor scenery" and "quite a lot of spectacular destruction", the film was otherwise "a completely routine affair", noting that the story comes to a complete halt when Marcus achieves victory in the arena.

References

Bibliography

External links

1960s historical films
Peplum films
Films directed by Antonio Margheriti
Films scored by Riz Ortolani
Films set in ancient Rome
Films set in the Roman Empire
Films set in the 4th century
Sword and sandal films
1960s Italian films